Charles Joseph "Charlie" Camarda (born May 8, 1952, in Queens, New York) is an American engineer and a NASA astronaut who flew his first mission into space on board the Space Shuttle mission STS-114. He served as Senior Advisor for Engineering Development at NASA Langley Research Center. and was a senior advisor for innovation at the office of Chief Engineer in the Johnson Space Center.

Personal life
Camarda is a native of Ozone Park, Queens, New York and graduated from academic and athletic powerhouse Archbishop Molloy High School in 1970. Speaking of his early interest in space flight, Camarda said, "It was a time when spaceflight was so intriguing. It was natural for me to want to be an astronaut, to dream of being an astronaut." He is married to Katherine
Camarda. 

He has one daughter, Chelsea Camarda Morton, one grandson, Vincent Cash Morton, and one granddaughter, Kennedy Grace Morton.

Education
Camarda graduated from Nativity B.V.M.(Now known as Divine Mercy Catholic Academy)and went to Archbishop Molloy High School. He graduated with a bachelor's degree in aerospace engineering from Polytechnic Institute of Brooklyn in 1974, a master's degree in engineering science from George Washington University in 1980, and a doctorate in aerospace engineering from Virginia Polytechnic Institute and State University in 1990.

Career
After receiving his bachelor's degree, Camarda began work as a research scientist at the NASA's Langley Research Center in Hampton, Virginia. In the Thermal Structures Branch, he was responsible for demonstrating the viability of a heat-pipe cooled leading edge for the Space Shuttle. Camarda then headed up the High-Speed Research and Reusable Launch Vehicle programs and oversaw several test facilities such as the Thermal Structure Laboratory, where he worked on numerous Shuttle component developments.

Camarda holds seven patents on various innovations, including NASA's Heat-Pipe-Cooled Sandwich Panel, named one of the top 100 technical innovations of 1983 by Industrial Research Magazine. After more than 20 years of experience in diverse Shuttle technology applications, he made a career change that put him closer to his work while achieving his dream. Camarda was named a mission specialist in 1996. He also served as a faculty at NYU Poly.

NASA career
Camarda served as a back-up crew member for Expedition 8 of the International Space Station. His first space flight was STS-114, NASA's "return to flight" mission following the loss of Space Shuttle Columbia.

Camarda continues to work for NASA and has pioneered an engineering pedagogical approach called EPIC - that explores how to develop a mission as a collaborative training project. He has toured with this including in Finland in 2018.

Following his flight, he was the Director of Engineering at NASA's Johnson Space Center and served as Senior Advisor for Innovation to the Office of Chief Engineer, NASA Headquarters. Camarda retired from NASA in 2019.

References

External links
 
STS-114 Charles Camarda Crew Profile
Spacefacts biography of Charles Camarda
http://charliecamarda.com/

People from Queens, New York
Archbishop Molloy High School alumni
Virginia Tech alumni
George Washington University School of Engineering and Applied Science alumni
1953 births
Living people
Polytechnic Institute of New York University alumni
NASA civilian astronauts
Polytechnic Institute of New York University faculty
People from Ozone Park, Queens
Space Shuttle program astronauts